The state of Western Australia requires its residents to register their motor vehicles and display vehicle registration plates.

As well as issuing general number plates, Western Australia also issues plates specific to the state's local government areas (LGAs). LGA-specific plates can only be requested by vehicle owners who are resident within these LGAs. Western Australia also has a plate series for vehicles designated for off-road use only.

Issuing authorities 
 Department for Planning and Infrastructure: early 2000s to 2009
 Department of Transport: 2009–present

General plates 
 Starting in the 1950s, WA released the U series plates, which commenced in a 6 character white-on-black design (example: UAA·000) and changed during their release to be of an inverted black-on-white design (example: UZZ·999) as would be seen continued in the release of the X-series plates (example: XAA·000). The letters "Q" and "V" were not issued in any combinations, due to these being easily mistaken for "O" or "0" and "U", "Q" used for Western Australia government only. The X-series and U-series plates are now available again by request, as "retro" plates in either black-on-white, or white-on-black. UQB-nnn was reserved for Transperth (formerly MTT) buses with three-digit registration numbers usually corresponding to the bus fleet numbers. Buses introduced after 1989 use the TP-nnnn reserved range. Other Government vehicles also used "Q" as the second character until the new series in 1997.
 Between 1978 and 1997 the format used was black on yellow (example: 6AA·000), where the numbers preceding the letters ranged between 6 and 9. This series ended at 9MZ-999 and the trailer series ended at 9RZ-999.
 The current standard issue series is blue on white, with an extra letter added to create the 7 character registration plate standard (example:  1AAA·000). Introduced in July 1997, it commenced with the characters 1AAA-000, estimated at the time to reach 1ZZZ-999 in 2137. As of March 2020, the general issue had reached the "1H" sequence, having skipped the "1F" series. Instead, the "1F" allocation has been reserved for a new silver-on-black slimline plate to be sold in sequential order as a Platinum plate for $125. These became available on 23 May 2016.
 Privately owned buses or designated school buses use the current series.
 Commercially operated buses and coaches require TC-nnnn (touring coach) platesthis is being withdrawn from the end of April 2017 and replaced with CVL -1234 (Charter Vehicle).
 TAXI-nnnn plates are used for taxicabs. Originally in red on white and now into Black on white non perpetual Taxi plates.
 CT-nnnn plates are used for taxicabs outside of the metropolitan area (Perth).
 Limousines carry the plate SCV-nnn, SCV-nnnn and also use 1SCV-nnn- this is being withdrawn from the end of April 2017 and replaced with CVL -1234 (Charter Vehicle).
 Private Taxi PT-123 issued to private taxis that this is being withdrawn from the end of April 2017 and replaced with CVL -1234 (Charter Vehicle).
 Motorcycles have the plate 1aa-nnn (e.g.: 1AB-123).
 Stock Carrying Trucks have 'ST' as the second & third letters of the prefix; e.g., 6ST-123, 9ST-123, 1STA-123.
 Trailers, caravans etc. have 1Taa-nnn (e.g.: 1TAB-123). Earlier series used 'R', 'S', 'T', 'U', 'W' and 'X' as the second character for trailers (e.g. 9RA-123, 8UA-123, 7WA-123, 6TA-123, XUA-123, UUU-123). Country Shire/Town trailer plates follow the normal shire prefix system, but only one plate is issued, some shires have a block of numbers for trailers, others issue the next available number.

Outside metropolitan Perth 
 There are 143 registration districts (mostly shire or town councils) which each issue number plates using the form "loc·n" (for shires) and "loc n" (for towns or cities) – for example, "A nnnn" would be a plate issued by the City of Albany, while "AU·nnnn" would be issued by the Shire of Augusta-Margaret River. A full list has been published near the back of the government-produced Metropolitan Street Directory/Streetsmart each year since 1985. Special number plate versions for shires, cities and towns have been made available to purchase. They are in the format "nnn*loc" with the shire-, city- or town-crest between the numbers and letters.
 In recent years towns within shires have been allocated number plates. Examples include "FR·nnn" for Frankland in Shire of Cranbrook and "KND·nnn" for Kendenup in the Shire of Plantagenet.
 A full list can also be obtained from https://web.archive.org/web/20120313005521/http://www.regionalwa.com.au/WAinfo/TT_CountryCars.htm

Other general and personalised plates 
Western Australia also offers the largest number of characters in a personalised registration plate, offering up to nine characters. Western Australian government plates are the same pattern as standard issue, however colours are inverted.

Slogans on Western Australian registration plates changed a number of times in the 1980s, and included "State of Excitement", "Home of the America's Cup" and "The Golden State". However, slogans were abandoned at the beginning of the 1990s.

Slogans

Personalised

Euro-style

Withdrawn plates

Skipped combinations 
Old General series 1956-1997 (U,X,6-9)AB-123: UAQ, UAV, UBQ, UBV, up to UZQ, UZV; UQA-UQZ, UVA-UVZ; XAQ, XAV, XBQ, XBV, up to XZQ, XZV; XQA-XQZ, XVA-XVZ, 6AQ, 6AV, 6BQ, 6BV up to 9MQ, 9MV; 6QA-6QZ, 6VA-6VZ, 7QA-7QZ, 7VA-7VZ, 8QA-8QZ, 8VA-8VZ, 9NA-9QZ, 9RQ, 9RV, 9SA-9ZZ.

References

Vehicle registration plates of Australia
Transport in Western Australia
Western Australia-related lists